Bronner's Christmas Wonderland (stylized Bronner's CHRISTmas Wonderland) is a retail store in Frankenmuth, Michigan, that promotes itself as the "World's Largest Christmas Store".

Outside the entrance are three  outdoor Santas and a  snowman. Inside the store, there are approximately 800 animated figurines. Some 100,000 lights illuminate Bronner's  Christmas Lane. Michigan designated Bronner's as an "Embassy for Michigan Tourism" in 1976. Bronner's employs over 500 people during the holiday season (between October and Christmas).

Founded in 1945 by Wally Bronner, Bronner's Christmas Wonderland is visited annually by over two million people, with the weekend after Thanksgiving being the busiest of the year with over 50,000 visitors. Its inventory exceeds 50,000 items, including Christmas ornaments, artificial Christmas trees, Christmas lights, Nativity scenes, Christmas decorations, collectibles, and similar goods. Bronner's has the exclusive right to sell Precious Moments Christmas-themed figurines.

With the government of Austria's permission and in keeping with the German theme of Frankenmuth itself, Bronner's built a replica of the Oberndorf, Austria, Silent Night Memorial Chapel in 1992 as a tribute to the Christmas hymn "Silent Night".

Wally Bronner, 81, died on April 1st, 2008.

Bronner's was vandalized on Christmas Day in 2010, with some 75 store displays damaged or destroyed. Five men pleaded guilty to the crime, which involved an estimated $40,000 in damage.

In 2018, there were over 350 decorated Christmas trees inside and products from 70 countries in the 320,000 square foot building. 

Irene Bronner died on October 16, 2022, at the age of 95.

References

External links
 Bronner's website
 Precious Moments at Bronner's

Buildings and structures in Michigan
Buildings and structures in Saginaw County, Michigan
Tourist attractions in Saginaw County, Michigan
Christmas in the United States
Christmas economics
Companies based in Michigan
Retail companies established in 1945
1945 establishments in Michigan
Christmas organizations